The  is a ryokan located in Chigasaki, Kanagawa, Japan. It describes itself as one of the few remaining seaside ryokan in the Shonan area to preserve the atmosphere of that age, when such establishments were plentiful, making it an important part of the Shonan area’s cultural history.

Overview 
Chigasakikan opened its doors in 1899 and stands as a rare remnant of the many traditional villas and vacation homes that were formerly in the Shonan bay area. Film directors such as Yasujirō Ozu and Kaneto Shindo, were some of the many who regularly used the area as their holiday home.

History 
1899: Chigasakikan is founded by Shinjiro Mori, from Aichi prefecture.
1902: Otojiro Kawakami and Sada Yacco Kawakami return from their first European tour and start rehearsing William Shakespeare's “Othello” which is to become Japan's first-ever performance of a western-styled play. Suiin Emi depicts the two rehearsing in his novel, “Mizore”.
1937: Yasujirō Ozu stays at Chigasakikan for the first time.
1941: Ozu begins to regularly stay at the ryokan where he would spend long hours writing his scripts. He would continue to reside in his accustomed “room 2”, and used it as his workroom with Takai Yanai, Tadao Ikeda, and Kogo Noda. Scripts for There Was a Father, “Record of a Tenement Gentleman”, “A Hen in the Wind”, “Late Spring”, “The Munetaka Sisters”, “Early Summer”, “The Flavor of Green Tea over Rice”, Tokyo Story and Early Spring are amongst the many masterpieces that were written there.
1996: Shozo Ishizaka releases his book Ozu Yasujiro and Chigasakikan.
Around 2000, director Azuma Morisaki uses “room 2” as his workplace.
2006: The film Honey and Clover uses the ryokan as its film location. Since then, Chigasakikan has appeared regularly in both domestic and international films. 
2007: Directors Hirokazu Kore-eda and Miwa Nishikawa start to use the ryokan to write their scripts.
2009: The Meiji-era bathhouse and the Taisho-era lobby, second floor, and terrace become the first in Chigasaki city to become Japan's Registered Cultural Heritage

Notable facts 
Founder Shinjiro Mori, who was chief engineer of wartime “Mitsubishi Mail Steamship Company” (now Nippon Yusen Kaisha) sees Chigasaki from his ship and decides to open a seaside ryokan.
Shinjiro's successor Nobuyuki was known as a hipster during his time; always at the forefront of trends. He rode around on his motorbike and car during the 1920s and enjoyed surfing on the wooden surfboard still displayed in the ryokan.
The 1923 Great Kanto Earthquake destroys most of the architecture and the Meiji-era “Karakasa” ceiling bath is the only part of the venue that remains intact. The rest is re-constructed in 1925.
From 1937, director Ozu would invite guests to his room and entertain them with self-cooked food. Of the dishes he would make, the “curry suki-yaki” was his specialty. Oil stains from the “suki-yaki” (a sort of Japanese-style hot pot) still remain on the ceiling of “room 2”. This menu is now known as Chigasakikan's specialty dish.
In 2013, Kore’eda's Nobody Knows is screened at Chigasakikan for the 2nd Chigasaki film festival. Kore'eda had just been awarded the Prix du Jury at the Cannes film festival for his latest film Like Father, Like Son, and the talk show held post-screening was the first time he spoke to the Japanese public. Chigasakikan also appears in Kore’eda's essay Speed of Walking.
Director Miwa Nishikawa discusses her experiences of writing scripts at the Chigasakikan in the monthly magazine Joy Novel (July edition, 2014). This essay can be found in the book X about film 2.
Directors Kazuyuki Izutsu, Hirokazu Kore’eda appraise Chigasakikan, as ”a great place to write.”
Musicians Temiyan and Yoshitaka Minami hold a concert in the garden and hall.
Maison de H×M, a French restaurant based in Hiratsuka holds an opening reception for their new domestic wine. Owner Hiroaki Aiyama produces restaurants, parties, and operates catering delivery services in the Shonan area.
In August 2011, the ryokan held a mid-summer “Senbaya” garden party to recover from the shock of the Tohoku Earthquake and Tsunami. More than 1000 people visit each day.
Yoga master Deborah Koehn chooses to stay at Chigasakikan when coming to Japan and holds TOKOYOGA workshops.
The current head owner, Hiroaki Mori is also the chairman for the Chigasaki film festival and runs the Shonan Teien festival as well.
In May 2016, the Japanese rock band Suchmos shot their MV for their hit single Mint. This MV would go on to win the Best New Artist Video-Japan at the “MTV VMAJ 2016”. The scenes that were shot at the Chigasakikan were: (1) Yonce singing at the bench, (2) Yonce walking from the Chigasakikan gate to the beach, (3) Yonce reading a book at the lounge.

Usage as film location
 Honey and Clover (2006) - A romantic film that depicts the lives and relationships of a group of art school students who live in the same apartment building. The scene where Morita rips up a wall painting and draws a dragon with soy sauce was shot in room 3. In real life, the actual room has glass windows and Ooka-Echizen's work is hung on the wall.
 Umi no Ue no Kimi wa, Itsumo Egao (2008) – A coming to age story about a high school girl in search of her brother's lost surfboard. Chigasakikan appears as the ryokan that displays Japan's oldest surfboard (made in the 1920s). This surf had been used as a garden bench at the venue for over 50 years until a pro surfer and surfboard maker happened to stumble upon it in 2005.
Chigasaki Story (2014) - Directed by Takuya Misawa, the film is about a love romance between 7 guests, whose lives intersect at a resort in Chigasaki. The film was set in Chigasaki, and the “resort” was Chigasakikan. Thus, much of the scenes were shot mainly in the ryokan.
 Vampire night (2016) - A film about the battle against vampire hunters and Medieval European vampires who arrive in Japan. Chigasakikan appears as the ryokan, deep in the mountains, that is said to have a hot spring that cures all diseases.
77 Heartbreaks (2016) - A Hong Kong film directed by Herman Yau, the film depicts a couple that ends their relationship after 10 years. The couple, who are fans of Yasujiro Ozu, visit Japan to stay at the Chigasakikan.
Chihayafuru (2018) – The film is about Chihaya Ayase, a teenage girl who is inspired by her new classmate to take up competitive Hyakunin isshu Karuta. The hall and lounge are used as the Tokyo University Karuta club room.
 Love Roaming (2018) – A Hong Kong film directed by Charlie Choi. Sasa Tao comes to Tokyo after ending her 13-year relationship with her boyfriend. She stays at an old inn called Yamada Inn with 4 strange tenants. Chigasakikan is the old Yamada Inn. World Premiered in Okinawa International Movie Festival.

References

1/2 Sankei newspaper (2018/1/7) Chigasakikan, “Ozu’s writing lodge”
3 Chigasaki City homepage. “Registration tangible cultural property – Chigasaki hall”

Sources
Ozu Yasujiro and Chigasakikan(Shozo Ishizaka published in 1996)
Aruku yo na haysa de (Hirokazu Kore'eda published in 2013)
X about film 2. (Miwa Nishikawa published in 2017)

1899 establishments in Japan
Hotels established in 1899
Hotels in Kanagawa Prefecture
Chigasaki, Kanagawa
Ryokan